Macedonia competed at the 2004 Summer Paralympics in Athens, Greece. The team included three athletes—two men and one woman. Macedonian competitors won a single silver medal at the Games, to finish 66th in the medal table.

Medallists

Sports

Shooting

Men

Women

See also
North Macedonia at the Paralympics
Macedonia at the 2004 Summer Olympics

References 

Nations at the 2004 Summer Paralympics
2004
2004 in Republic of Macedonia sport